Basim Shami (born October 7, 1976) is a Palestinian-born American businessman. He started his career at Farouk Systems, a Houston-based haircare products company his father founded in 1986.

Early life and education

Basim Shami was born on October 7, 1975, in Ramallah, West Bank. After his family immigrated to the United States, he attended the Houston Baptist University from which he earned his Bachelor of Science as well as a Master's degree in Human Resource Management.

Career
While he was studying, Basim worked at his father's company for haircare products, Farouk Systems. After graduation he took more important roles in the company, and was responsible for marketing, logistics, and product development, and by 1995 he founded his own venture, Beauty Elite Group, which he has been its CEO since then. It had acquired some local companies such as BlowPro. Basim's involvement in Farouk Systems has been always active, as he has taken more roles until eventually becoming the company's CEO, and has been among the company's top executives, along with his father, Farouk, and his brother Rami. He has helped the company to launch new products and expanding its scale.

Basim Shami has been seen on Celebrity Apprentice, Univision, NBC, and CNN as well as other television outlets. He also served as a judge for the 2010 Miss Universe Pageant. He also has been involved in philanthropic activities.

He was selected as a finalist for the 2013 Ernst & Young Entrepreneur of the Year.

References

1976 births
Living people
Palestinian business executives
Palestinian philanthropists
Palestinian emigrants to the United States
People from Ramallah